Lake Sidihoni is a lake located within Samosir Island which itself is an island within Lake Toba, in North Sumatra, Indonesia and is therefore notable for being a "lake on an island in a lake on an island". It is approximately 11–12 km to the east of hot spring pools at Pangururan.

References

Sidihoni
Landforms of North Sumatra
Lake Toba